Angelyne is an American drama television miniseries created by Nancy Oliver and starring Emmy Rossum as Angelyne. It premiered on Peacock on May 19, 2022.

Premise 
Angelyne is an enigmatic blonde bombshell who rose to fame in the 1980s with billboard advertisements featuring her image. In the 2010s, Jeff Glaser, a journalist for The Hollywood Reporter, is trying to uncover the true identity and life story of Angelyne. However, his efforts are hampered by her secrecy and conflicting accounts from herself and those who know her.

Cast and characters

Main 
 Emmy Rossum as Angelyne
 Hamish Linklater as Rick Krause, president of the Angelyne Fan Club (based on Scott Hennig)
 Philip Ettinger as Cory Hunt, guitarist of the band Baby Blue (based on Jordan Michaels)
 Charlie Rowe as Freddy Messina, keyboardist of Baby Blue
 Alex Karpovsky as Jeff Glaser, a journalist for The Hollywood Reporter (based on Gary Baum)
 Martin Freeman as Harold Wallach (based on Hugo Maisnik)
 Molly Ephraim as Wendy Wallach (based on Katherine Saltzberg née Maisnik)
 Lukas Gage as Max Allen (based on Jesse Small)
 Michael Angarano as Danny

Guest 
 Antjuan Tobias as Bud Griffin, drummer of Baby Blue
 Rosanny Zayas as Glaser's assistant
 Kerry Norton as Edie Wallach (based on Joy Maisnik)
 Tonatiuh as Andre Casiano
 Toby Huss as Hugh Hefner
 Darryl Stephens as Pete
 David Krumholtz as Max Allen's lawyer
 Ian Fisher as Eli Goldman

In addition, Michael Shuman co-stars as Ray, bassist of Baby Blue.

Episodes

Reception
The review aggregator website Rotten Tomatoes reported a 86% approval rating based on 21 critic reviews, with an average rating of 8.7/10. The website's critics consensus reads, "Emmy Rossum brings remarkable depth to a cipher in Angelyne, a glitzy look at fame for fame's sake where the inscrutability is the point." Metacritic, which uses a weighted average, assigned a score of 74 out of 100 based on 15 critic reviews, indicating "generally favorable reviews".

Awards and nominations

References

External links 
 
 

2020s American drama television miniseries
2022 American television series debuts
2022 American television series endings
American biographical series
English-language television shows
Nonlinear narrative television series
Peacock (streaming service) original programming
Television series based on actual events
Television series by Anonymous Content
Television series by Universal Content Productions
Television series set in the 1970s
Television series set in the 1980s
Television series set in 2015
Television series set in 2019
Television shows set in Los Angeles